

References 
 

 Svalbard
Geology of Norway
Fossiliferous stratigraphic units